St Martin's (meaning "dappled island") is the northernmost populated island of the Isles of Scilly, England.

Description

There are three main settlements on the island - Higher Town, Middle Town and Lower Town - in addition to a number of scattered farms and cottages, with a total population (2011 census) of 136.

There are two quays - at Higher Town (the Higher Town Quay, used at high tide) and at Lower Town (the Hotel Quay, used at low tide). In Higher Town there is a post office.

There is a vineyard on the island.

To the north, St Martin's is joined by a tidal causeway to White Island.

Daymark
At the northeast corner of the island is a large red-and-white daymark. It was erected in 1683 by Thomas Ekins, first steward of the Godophin Family to live on the islands.

The blocked arched entrance door contains an incorrect date of 1637. It was painted white until 1822 but by 1833 had been painted red, and is now painted in bands of red and white.

Despite its modernity, the daymark, alongside some prehistoric cairns, is a Scheduled Ancient Monument.

The daymark is built on the highest point of St Martin's — and the second-highest point in the Isles of Scilly — and the islands' only Ordnance Survey triangulation station is situated by the daymark; the position and relative height mean that the Cornish mainland is visible (when the weather allows) and the daymark is identifiable from the mainland too.

Religion
There are two churches on St Martin's: the Anglican parish church of St Martin's and St Martin's Methodist Church, both located in the Higher Town area. The Methodist chapel dates from about 1845 and is part of the Isles of Scilly Methodist Circuit.

Civil parish and ward

St Martin's is one of the five civil parishes of the Isles of Scilly, which are also wards. The civil parish and ward include several uninhabited islands and rocks, including the Eastern Isles, Great Ganilly, English Island and White Island. St Martin's returns one councillor to the Council of the Isles of Scilly, the same as the other "off-island" wards. The civil parish is not functional however, and there is no council or meeting.

Education
Five Islands Academy (previously Five Islands School) has its St Martin's Base, a primary campus. Secondary pupils board at the St Mary's main campus, staying there on weekdays and coming back and forth to their home islands on weekends.

Students at the sixth-form college level reside and board elsewhere, in mainland Great Britain. Previously the Learning and Skills Council paid for costs of accommodation for sixth-formers.

Population

Source

See also

List of shipwrecks of the Isles of Scilly

References

External links

 Isles of Scilly Wildlife Trust

 
Inhabited islands of the Isles of Scilly
Civil parishes in Cornwall